Spectacle Island may refer to:

Australia
 Spectacle Island (Hawkesbury River), New South Wales
 Spectacle Island (Port Jackson), New South Wales
 Spectacle Island (Tasmania)
 Little Spectacle Island, Tasmania

United States
 Spectacle Island (Maine)
 Spectacle Island (Massachusetts)

Canada
 Spectacle Island Game Sanctuary, Baddeck, Nova Scotia